Pike County is a county in the U.S. state of Kentucky. As of the 2020 Census, the population was 58,669. Its county seat is Pikeville. The county was founded in 1821. With regard to the sale of alcohol, it is classified as a moist county–– a county in which alcohol sales are prohibited (a dry county), but containing a "wet" city. There are three cities in the county, Pikeville, Elkhorn City, and Coal Run Village, where package alcohol sales are legal.

History
Pike is Kentucky's easternmost county and the commonwealth's largest county by land area. Pike County is the 11th most populous county in Kentucky, immediately preceded by Bullitt County and followed by Christian County. Pike County is Kentucky's third largest banking center, with financial institutions and holding companies with more than $1 billion in assets. In the five years spanning 1995–2000, personal income increased by 28%, and the county's per capita income exceeded the national and state average growth rates of the past decade. Pike County is the seventy-first Kentucky county in order of creation.

Pike County was founded on December 19, 1821, from a portion of Floyd County. The county was named for General Zebulon Pike, the explorer who discovered Pikes Peak. Between 1860 and 1891 the Hatfield-McCoy feud raged in Pike and in bordering Mingo County, West Virginia. On May 6, 1893, Pikeville officially became a city and the county seat.

Pike County is also home to Paul E. Patton, former governor of Kentucky.

The Appalachian News Express, published in Pikeville, is preserved on microfilm by the University of Kentucky Libraries. The microfilm holdings are listed in a master negative database on the university's Libraries Preservation and Digital Programs website.

Geography
It is the largest county by area in Kentucky.

The main population areas of the county include the city of Pikeville and surrounding suburbs, Elkhorn City, and the unincorporated town of South Williamson.

Major highways

Pike County has a total of 486.285 miles of classified roads.

Adjacent counties

 Martin County  (north)
 Mingo County, West Virginia  (east)
 Buchanan County, Virginia  (southeast)
 Dickenson County, Virginia (south)
 Wise County, Virginia (south)
 Letcher County (southwest)
 Knott County  (southwest)
 Floyd County  (west)
 McDowell County, West Virginia  (far east) While not bordering the county directly it is only separated by a nearly 2-mile corridor of Buchanan County, Virginia

Demographics

2000 census
As of the census of 2000, there were 68,736 people, 27,612 households, and 20,377 families residing in the county. The racial makeup of the county was 98.35% White, 0.45% Black or African American, 0.11% Native American, 0.41% Asian, 0.03% Pacific Islander, 0.10% from other races, and 0.56% from two or more races.  0.65% of the population were Hispanic or Latino of any race.

The largest self-reported ancestry groups in Pike County, Kentucky are:
 18.2% "American"
 16.1% English
 13.1% Irish
 6.7% German
 2.3% Scots-Irish
 1.3% Italian

There were 27,612 households, out of which 33.70% had children under the age of 18 living with them, 58.80% were married couples living together, 11.40% had a female householder with no husband present, and 26.20% were non-families. 24.10% of all households were made up of individuals, and 9.80% had someone living alone who was 65 years of age or older. The average household size was 2.46 and the average family size was 2.90.

The age distribution was 23.70% under the age of 18, 9.20% from 18 to 24, 30.00% from 25 to 44, 24.90% from 45 to 64, and 12.30% who were 65 years of age or older. The median age was 37 years. For every 100 females there were 95.50 males. For every 100 females age 18 and over, there were 91.20 males.

The median income for a household in the county was $23,930, and the median income for a family was $29,302. Males had a median income of $32,332 versus $19,229 for females. The per capita income for the county was $14,005. About 20.60% of families and 23.40% of the population were below the poverty line, including 30.20% of those under age 18 and 16.10% of those age 65 or over. The zip codes 41502 (Pikeville), 41503 (South Williamson), and 41527 (Forest Hills) are the wealthiest portions of the county. 41502 is the 50th wealthiest zip code in Kentucky, 41503 is the 61st wealthiest, and 41527 is the 63rd wealthiest. South Williamson and Forest Hills are located on the Northeast side of the county. These three areas combine to 2,129 residents and make up around 3% of the county's population. The average income for these areas are $51,962 (41502), $49,345 (41503), and $48,484 (41527).

Politics
Historically, Pike County was a solidly Republican county in presidential voting from 1896 to 1928 under the Fourth Party System, then a solidly Democratic county in presidential elections from 1932 until 2004. Since 2008, it has shifted back towards the Republican party in presidential voting.

Local politics have been dominated by the Democratic Party throughout its history,  while the county has been carried by Republicans in presidential races since 2008, most local offices, including judge-executive, sheriff, and several representatives in the Kentucky House of Representatives remain Democratic – there were no Republicans running in the last races for judge-executive and sheriff. In the 2022 Midterm Elections Pike County saw a “Red Wave” in which every incumbent County Commissioner was ousted along with Democratic incumbent County Clerk Rhonda Taylor, Democratic Incumbent County Attorney Kevin Keene, along with Democratic incumbent State Representative Angie Hatton.

Economy

Pike County has vast fossil fuel, (coal and natural gas) reserves. Pike County is one of the nation's leading coal and natural gas producers. In April 2007, Pike County announced the first-in-the-nation comprehensive energy strategy which was developed in partnership with the Southern States Energy Board.

Pike County is the second-largest coal producing county as reported in 2013 next to Union County in the western part of the state. Over 150 million tons are produced annually throughout the state.

The poverty level of counties in the Appalachian region of Kentucky is 24.4% compared to the United States Poverty Level of 12.4%. Of the top eight coal-producing counties in eastern Kentucky, Pike County is the only county that does not have a higher poverty rate than Appalachian Kentucky as a whole.

Coal companies in Pike County
 Alliance Resource Partners
 Alpha Natural Resources
 James River Coal Company
 Rhino Resource Partners
 TECO Coal

Economic growth

Over 1,400 businesses exist in Pikeville. From 2005 to 2011, downtown Pikeville experienced major growth. The Eastern Kentucky Exposition Center was constructed in 2005 and seats 7,000. It features numerous events including concerts and shows. The county is also home to the Pikeville Concert Association, which secures events that usually take place at Booth Auditorium on the campus of the University of Pikeville.

The Pikeville Medical Center received a $44 million loan from the U.S. Department of Agriculture Rural Development program in 2010 to construct an eleven-story office building and adjacent parking garage in downtown. Construction was completed in 2014.

The University of Pikeville broke ground on a nine-story building (the Coal Building) on Hambley Boulevard in downtown Pikeville in early 2011 to house the University of Pikeville's School of Osteopathic Medicine.

In the summer of 2011, Jenny Wiley Theatre group announced their collaboration with the city of Pikeville to construct a 200-seat indoor professional theater in downtown Pikeville. The theatre opened in May 2014.

Government
The office of Pike County Judge Executive served as a launching pad for the governorship of Paul E. Patton (1995–2003).

On November 8, 2016, Pike County voted to switch from a magisterial form of government to a commissioner form of government.  As of 2019, the Pike County Fiscal Court is composed of three county commissioners and the county judge/executive. This effort was a bi-partisan effort led by a citizens' group, Pike Countians Against Government Waste, that garnered signature petitions in 2015–2016 to place the question on the ballot. The voters of the 2016 election supported changing to a commissioner form of government with nearly 12,000 votes in favor, which was nearly 70% of the popular vote. In March 2016, the fiscal court which is composed of six magistrates and a judge-executive voted unanimously to sue the judge-executive (who voted to sue himself) to overturn the results of the ballot question to change the form of government. The fiscal court, composed of magistrates Jeff Anderson, Vernon "Chick" Johnson, Leo Murphy, Hilman Dotson, and Bobby Varney; and, Judge Bill Deskins, was first represented by John Doug Hays, Assistant County Attorney, and then by County Attorney Howard Keith Hall. The citizens' group was represented by State Senator Ray S. Jones, II, who filed a motion to intervene on behalf of the citizens of Pike County. In October 2017, Special Judge Rebecca Phillips of Morgan County dismissed the fiscal court lawsuit in a 23-page decision, which effectively ended the effort to overturn the voters decision. The commissioner form of government replaced the prior magistrate form of government in 2019.

Healthcare

Hospitals
 Pikeville Medical Center, Pikeville, Kentucky
 Appalachian Regional Healthcare, South Williamson, Kentucky

Education

Pike County colleges
 University of Pikeville (UPike), Pikeville, Kentucky
 Big Sandy Community and Technical College Pikeville Campus

Pike County Schools
The Pike County School System consists of 25 high, middle, and elementary schools.

High schools
 Belfry High School, Belfry, Kentucky
 East Ridge High School, Lick Creek, Kentucky
 Phelps High School, Phelps, Kentucky
 Pike County Central High School, Pikeville, Kentucky
 Shelby Valley High School, Pikeville, Kentucky

Middle and elementary schools
The following lists of middle and elementary schools is categorized by the high school they feed:
 Belfry High School System
 Belfry Middle School
 Bevins Elementary
 Belfry Elementary
 East Ridge High School System
 Elkhorn City Elementary School
 Feds Creek Elementary School
 Millard Elementary School
 Phelps High School System
 Phelps Elementary School
 Pike County Central High School System
 Johns Creek Elementary School
 Kimper Elementary School
 Mullins School
 Shelby Valley High School System
 Dorton School
 Valley Elementary School

Shelby Valley Day Treatment Center, Phelps Day Treatment Center, are all discipline facilities.
Northpoint Academy is a high school drop out prevention program that focuses on the individual needs of the student. All students at Northpoint are there on a voluntary basis.

Pikeville Independent Schools
 High School
 Pikeville High School, Pikeville
 Elementary School
 Pikeville Elementary School

Private schools
 St. Francis of Assisi Pikeville, Kentucky
 Christ Central Pikeville, Kentucky

Sports

Baseball
Pike County has had several minor league teams based out of Pikeville. In 1982 
the Pikeville Brewers were located in the city. They were part of the Appalachian League and affiliated with the Milwaukee Brewers. In 1983 the team changed to become affiliated with the Chicago Cubs, thus changing its name to the Pikeville Cubs. In 2010 Pikeville Independent's baseball team finished in the final four at the KHSAA Baseball State Tournament. In 2012 and in 2013 Pikeville Junior High baseball finished runner up in the Kentucky Middle School State Tournament both years.

Basketball
In 2007, the East Kentucky Miners came to Pike County after the opening of the Eastern Kentucky Exposition Center. The team played in Pikeville from 2007 to 2010. In 2010, the American Basketball Association opened an expansion franchise in Pikeville called the East Kentucky Energy. In 2010 Shelby Valley High School won the KHSAA Men's Basketball State Championship.  In 2011, UPike Men's Basketball won the National Championship defeating Mountain State University.

Football
In 2010, the Pike County Crusaders, an Indoor Arena Football team, was announced as coming to the Eastern Kentucky Expo Center, but the initiative soon failed.
In 2011, The East Kentucky Drillers, an Indoor Arena Football franchise came to the Eastern Kentucky Expo Center in Pikeville. In 2012, the team changed its name to the Kentucky Drillers.

Communities

Cities
 Coal Run Village
 Elkhorn City
 Pikeville (county seat)

Census-designated places

 Belfry
 Freeburn
 McCarr
 Phelps
 South Williamson
 Virgie

Other unincorporated places

 Ashcamp
 Beefhide (partial)
 Belcher
 Broad Bottom
 Canada
 Cedarville
 Dorton
 Fedscreek
 Fords Branch
 Garden Village
 Hellier
 Jonancy
 Kimper
 Lick Creek
 Mouthcard
 Phyllis
 Raccoon
 Shelbiana
 Sidney
 Stone
 Stopover
 Varney

Notable people

 Woody Blackburn – professional golfer
 Stephen Cochran – country music singer and songwriter
 Robert Damron – professional golfer
 Patty Loveless – country music singer
 Paul E. Patton – former Governor of Kentucky
 Mark Reynolds – professional baseball player
 Jonny Venters – professional baseball player
 Warner Wolf – sports journalist
 Dwight Yoakam – country music singer and songwriter
 Randolph McCoy- leader involved in the Hatfield McCoy feud
 Katherine G. Langley - first female member of Congress from the state of KY
 Mary Elliott Flanery - first female member of KY House of Representative
 Josh Osborne - country music songwriter

See also

 Big Sandy Area Development District
 Breaks Interstate Park
 Elkhorn City Railroad Museum
 Fishtrap Lake State Park
 Jefferson National Forest
 National Register of Historic Places listings in Pike County, Kentucky
 Pikeville Cut-Through

References

External links

 
 Pikeville-Pike County Visitors Center
 Pike County Schools
 Pikeville Independent Schools

 
1821 establishments in Kentucky
Counties of Appalachia
Kentucky counties
Populated places established in 1821